NA-35 Kohat is a constituency for the National Assembly of Pakistan. It covers tho whole of district Kohat. The constituency was formerly known as NA-14 Kohat from 1977 to 2018. The name changed to NA-32 Kohat after the delimitation in 2018 and to NA-35 Kohat after the delimitation in 2022.

Members of Parliament

1977–2002: NA-14 Kohat

2002–2018: NA-14 Kohat

2018-2023: NA-32 Kohat

Elections since 2002

2002 general election

A total of 3,748 votes were rejected.

2008 general election

A total of 3,029 votes were rejected.

2013 general election

A total of 5,600 votes were rejected.

2018 general election 

General elections were held on 25 July 2018.

2023 By-election 
A by-election will be held on 16 March 2023 due to the resignation of Shehryar Khan Afridi, the previous MNA from this seat.

See also
NA-34 Nowshera-II
NA-36 Hangu-cum-Orakzai

References

External links 
 Election result's official website

32
32